Temple Mountain is a  summit in Boundary County, Idaho, United States.

Temple Mountain was so named because its massive outline has the shape of a temple.

References

Mountains of Idaho
Mountains of Boundary County, Idaho